Pempeliella sororculella is a species of snout moth. It is found in the Republic of Macedonia and Greece.

The wingspan is about 24 mm.

References

Moths described in 1887
Phycitini
Moths of Europe